Gorjasbi Beg, better known as Mansur Khan, was a Safavid military commander, royal gholam, and official from the Georgian Orbeliani clan. He served as the commander of the empire's élite gholam corps (qollar-aghasi) sometime before 1693, and as the governor (beglarbeg) of Qandahar in 1663.

He was a son of the Georgian nobleman Aslamaz, and had at least two brothers, Otar (Zu al-Faqār) and Vakhushti, who held prominent positions like him. According to Alexander Orbeliani (1802–1869), he had one more brother named Kaykhosrow.

Notes

Sources
 
 
  
 

Qollar-aghasi
Iranian people of Georgian descent
Shia Muslims from Georgia (country) 
Nobility of Georgia (country)
Safavid governors of Qandahar
Safavid generals
17th-century people of Safavid Iran
Safavid ghilman